Lim Guan Eng (born 8 December 1960) is a Malaysian politician and accountant from the Democratic Action Party (DAP), a component party of the Pakatan Harapan (PH) coalition who has served as Member of Parliament (MP) for Bagan, Member of the Penang State Legislative Assembly (MLA) for Air Putih since March 2008 and 5th National Chairman of DAP since March 2022. He served as the 4th Secretary-General of DAP from September 2004 to March 2022, Minister of Finance in the PH administration under former Prime Minister Mahathir Mohamad from May 2018 until the collapse of the PH administration in February 2020, 4th Chief Minister of Penang from March 2008 to May 2018 and MP for Kota Melaka from August 1986 to November 1999.

In 2016, Lim was charged with corruption for buying a bungalow priced at below the market value. After the victory of his coalition, Pakatan Harapan, in the 2018 general elections, the court discharged him from the case, amounting to an acquittal. On 6 August 2020, Lim Guan Eng was arrested by the Malaysian Anti-Corruption Commission, following weeks of a probe into an RM6.3 billion undersea tunnel project that was green-lit during his tenure as Penang chief minister. According to the commission, Lim will be charged with bribery and abuse of power relating to the undersea tunnel project, and a separate abuse of power charge for the additional unspecified case.

Personal life 
Lim is the son of Lim Kit Siang, Leader of the Opposition in the Malaysian House of Representatives from 1973 to 1999 and 2004 to 2008. He is married to Betty Chew Gek Cheng (周玉清), who was former two-term MLA for Kota Laksamana in Malacca. She is the first serving assemblywoman to be married to a Chief Minister. They have four children. His younger sister Lim Hui Ying is the MP for Tanjong.

Early education 
Lim Guan Eng attended La Salle Primary English School in Petaling Jaya, and later the Batu Pahat Montfort Primary English School. For his secondary education, he attended Batu Pahat High School and Malacca High School. He graduated from Monash University in Australia with a Bachelor of Economics (BEc). He also served as the president of MUISS (Monash University International Student Society) during his university years.

Political career
Prior to his political career, Lim was a senior executive at a bank. He was first elected as the Member of Parliament for Kota Melaka in 1986, defeating Soh Chin Aun with a majority of 17,606 votes. He was re-elected in the 1990 and 1995 general elections, albeit with reduced majorities. He thus became the first person to be elected to three consecutive terms in Kota Melaka. He was also the first Malacca High School alumnus to achieve this.

He was appointed the DAP Socialist Youth chairman in 1989 and was formally elected to that post in 1992. In 1995, he was elected the DAP Deputy Secretary-General. He was elected the party's Secretary-General in 2004, and held that position until 2022. The same year, he was elected as National Chairman of the party.

Jailed under Sedition Act
Lim was arrested by the Malaysian police in 1994, following his criticism of the government's failure to bring the then-Chief Minister of Melaka, Abdul Rahim Thamby Chik's statutory rape case to trial when the Attorney General had decided not to press charges. Lim was charged under Section 4(1) (b) of the Sedition Act 1948 for causing 'disaffection with the administration of justice in Malaysia'. He was also charged under Section 8A (1) of the Printing Presses and Publications Act 1984 for 'maliciously printing' a pamphlet containing allegedly 'false information' which supposedly described the alleged rape victim as an 'imprisoned victim' because she was initially detained by Malaysian police without parental consent for 10 days.

After a series of appeals, Lim was sentenced to 18 months imprisonment. He was, however, released after 12 months on 25 August 1999. Due to his incarceration, he was barred from standing for election to public office for a period of 5 years, and he was therefore ineligible to contest in the 2004 Malaysian General Election.

Internal disputes
In 2005, Lim suffered a surprise defeat in his campaign for re-election to the Malacca DAP committee. However, as Lim remained Secretary-General of the party, he was automatically included in the committee in accordance with the party's constitution. His wife, who had also failed to be elected to the Melaka committee, was not included in the committee even though she remained the chief of the state's DAP women's wing. Teresa Kok, a DAP MP, suggested that there was a conspiracy behind the Lims' failure to be reelected. Nevertheless, Lim went on to garner the second highest number of votes (620) at the party's 15th National Congress on 23 August 2008.

Chief Minister of Penang 
In the 2008 Malaysian general election, the DAP-PKR-PAS coalition, later known as Pakatan Rakyat (PR), won 29 out of the 40 state assembly seats contested in Penang, defeating the Barisan Nasional (BN) coalition. The DAP won 19 seats, PKR 9 seats, and PAS 1. Even though Lim is not a Penangite, he was nominated to be the Chief Minister (CM) of Penang, replacing the former Chief Minister Dr. Koh Tsu Koon of Malaysian People's Movement Party (Gerakan). Other senior DAP leaders of Penang such as Lim Hock Seng, Phee Boon Poh, and Chow Kon Yeow were bypassed and were instead appointed as state executive council members. In the 2013 Malaysian general election, Pakatan Rakyat won a larger majority, gaining 30 out of the 40 state seats in Penang.

Governance 
When he took over as the new Penang CM, Lim announced an amnesty on all summonses issued by the Penang Island City Council and Seberang Perai Municipal Council involving vendors' licences and parking offences issued before March 2008.

On 14 March 2008, a mob composed mostly of UMNO members and supporters took to the streets illegally after Friday prayers to protest his statements on the NEP. No arrests were made but two men were taken in for questioning. Various BN-backed groups and NGOs continued to protest and lodge police reports as a form of continued harassment.

On 19 March 2008, Lim announced that the state exco had approved an open tender system for state projects exceeding RM 50,000. For projects between RM20,000 and RM50,000, a balloting system was introduced. A two-week objection period was put in place for both the open tender and balloting systems.

During Lim's tenure as CM, Penang maintained its rank as one of the top states for investments in Malaysia. The state attracted RM12.2 billion worth of capital investments in 2010, which accounted for 25% of the total investments in Malaysia. This was a 465% increase on the investment of RM2.17 billion in 2009. In 2011, Penang was the top state in terms of manufacturing investments in Malaysia for the second consecutive year, attracting RM9.1 billion in total. However, using a new measure of total investment that took into account the manufacturing, services and private sectors, Penang ranked second in Malaysia after Sarawak in total investments, with a total amount of RM14.038 billion. This was due to it not having much in terms of primary sector investments.

The public debt in Penang decreased by 95% from RM630 million in 2008 to RM30 million at the end of 2011. In 2014, Penang recorded a total of RM8.16 billion in investments, which was a 109% increase. Manufacturing investment in Penang increased by 87% to RM53.9 billion in the 2008-2016 period compared to RM24.9 billion in the 2000-2007 period, with a 17% increase in job creation. Foreign investments (FDI) also increased by 62.5% to RM36.7 billion in the 2008-2015 period compared to RM22.6 billion during 2000–2007. Penang currently has the second highest GDP per capita in the country.

Penang's economic growth rate in 2015 was 5.5%, which was higher than Malaysia's growth rate of 5%. Penang has an unemployment rate of 1.5% compared to the national unemployment rate of 3.1%.

On 28 April 2011, Lim signed a memorandum of understanding (MOU) with China, witnessed by the Chinese premier Wen Jiabao and Malaysian Prime Minister Najib Razak, on the proposal to construct three roads and an undersea tunnel on Penang island. The 6.5 km undersea tunnel is to be the third link between the island and Butterworth on the mainland. According to Lim, this would ease traffic congestion in the state and improve the links between the island and the mainland.

On 25 July 2014, the Penang state government unveiled the RM27 billion Penang Transport Master Plan (PTMP) that comprises an integrated transportation network connecting both Penang Island and Seberang Perai. The PTMP aims to achieve a well-defined and fully connected road network and dispersal system as well as a well-integrated and sustainable public transport system, which combines buses, trams, MRT and water taxis. The project was expected to start in 2015 and be completed in 2030.

Under Lim's tenure, the Penang Island Municipal Council was officially upgraded to city council status on 1 January 2015 by the Yang di-Pertuan Agong. The state government had been applying to the Malaysian federal government to grant city status since January 2010.

Competency, Accountability and Transparency (CAT) 

Led by Chief Minister Lim Guan Eng, the Penang state government practised the concept of Competency, Accountability, and Transparency (CAT) in governance. The concept guides the state government in achieving efficient, responsible, and clean governance. It also aims to turn Penang into a cleaner, greener and safer state. The CAT concept encourages positive work ethics and team spirit. It has helped the state government to record budget surpluses and successfully attract RM 12.2 billion in capital investments. According to the international weekly news magazine The Economist, the reform of the state government has ended the cronyism and corruption that led to major deficits under the previous regime.

The Penang state government under Lim received praise from the Auditor-General as the best financially managed state in Malaysia from 2008 to 2010. According to the AG's report, the consolidated fund increased by 2.7%, from RM 1101.89 million in 2009 to RM 1131.17 million in 2010. Likewise, the consolidated revenue fund has grown by 6.2% from RM 538.95 million in 2009 to RM 572.49 million in 2010. Lim's state government has also won accolades from Transparency International for implementing open tenders in awarding contracts.

Welfare aid and programs 
The record budget surpluses were channeled to social welfare programs such as financial aid to the hardcore poor, cash handouts to the elderly, public housing upgrades, free Wi-Fi service at selected hot spots, and free bus services within the city and between Penang island and Seberang Perai for workers. Social welfare aid of RM 100 is awarded annually to senior citizens, single mothers, disabled individuals, new-born babies, and school-going pupils in Primary 1 and 4 as well as Form 1 and 4.

On 1 March, Lim launched the Bridge Express Shuttle Transit (BEST), which is a free-of-charge park and ride shuttle bus service which ferries commuters across the Penang Bridge from Seberang Jaya to the Bayan Lepas Free Industrial Zone. This bus service aims to increase usage of public transport, which in turn will reduce traffic congestion during peak hours on the Penang Bridge and therefore ease the financial burden of factory workers.

The SMART Centre Penang is an initiative set up by the Penang state government and the think tank investPenang during the Penang Outlook Forum in June 2009 chaired by Lim. The SMART Centre intends to provide market intelligence, business advice, information, resources and training services to small and medium enterprises (SMEs) in Penang. It focuses on the promotion of local sourcing, investments and networking by running various programs such as business matching, seminars and talks.

Under Pakatan Rakyat's Agenda Ekonomi Sosial (AES) or Social Economic Agenda, the Penang state government is aiming to be the first state in Malaysia to eradicate poverty by ensuring every household in Penang has an income of at least RM 770 per month. The poverty line is RM 763 per month for every household/family in Peninsular Malaysia. Families with less than RM 770 in monthly income will have the difference topped up by the state government every month.

Aside from that, the Penang state government under Lim began to give annual allocations to Chinese independent high schools and also increased annual allocations to Chinese, Tamil and mission schools in Penang which are either not funded or only partially funded by the Education Ministry of Malaysia.

On 7 June 2014, Lim donated RM 20,000 to the soup kitchen, The Lighthouse, to assist the organisation's efforts in feeding the homeless and poor.

On 1 April 2015, the Penang state government under Lim launched the 'Penang Future Foundation (PFF)' scholarship program, which awards scholarships to outstanding young Malaysian students who wish to pursue their undergraduate studies at local private higher educational institutions. Scholarship recipients are required to work in Penang after they graduate. The scholarship program is administered by the Penang state government but is fully funded by the private sector to ensure its sustainability in the long run. This program was launched to attract young talented people to work in the state.
 Lim also made his appearance as the guest of honour at the launch of "The Rise of Digital India" exhibition in Penang on 19 April 2015 with Deputy Chief Minister Ramasamy Palanisamy also accompanied by Mr J. Philip Vincent to create and ensure the Penang-India bond of space, aeronautics and technology.

Cleaner, Greener Penang 
Cleaner, Greener Penang is an initiative by the Penang state government launched in 2010 as part of an effort to transform Penang into the most environmentally friendly and liveable city in Malaysia through education, enforcement and appreciation. This is to restore the current living environment into a cleaner and more sustainable city, which in turn will improve the quality of living.

The Penang state government, led by Lim, enforced the ban on free plastic bags throughout the state on 1 January 2010, despite an initial lukewarm response from retail outlets. Lim said the move would reduce the state's garbage production and carbon footprint. Retail stores, food outlets and hawker stalls statewide are required to adhere to the rulings to ensure renewal of business licences. The proceedings from the sale of plastic bags went to the "Partners Against Poverty" Special Fund to assist the state's hardcore poor. This initiative was the first of its kind in Malaysia.

On 11 December 2011, Lim initiated the Car Free Day which would be held every Sunday at particular stretches of roads in the interior city of George Town, Penang. All motor vehicles are prohibited from entering these areas on that day, which are part of Lim's efforts to transform Penang into a sustainable city and fight climate change. In addition, the state government is also considering a proposal to set up bicycle lanes around Penang island, mainly along coastal areas and Seberang Perai, scheduled to be completed by 2020. The dedicated bicycle lanes in Penang island will cover a coastal route between Penang Second Bridge to Batu Maung and Teluk Bahang. In Seberang Perai, it will cover a 140 km stretch including state and town roads and is subjected to feedback from the public. Lim wanted to promote Penang as the first state to promote cycling as a healthy activity and reduce dependency on motor vehicles.

On 1 August 2014, the Penang state government implemented a bicycle sharing system in its effort to transform George Town into a greener and more sustainable city. It awarded a RM9.2 million contract to Public Bike Share Sdn. Bhd. to design, install and operate the bicycle sharing system in the city. The system consists of 25 bicycle stations with 1,000 bicycle docks and 500 bicycles throughout George Town. Lim believes that the system will alleviate traffic congestion as well as improve visitors' experience by making places accessible without cars and thus support the state government's initiative in a cleaner, greener, safer and healthier Penang.

Foreign delegations and state visits 
On 6 November 2011, the Penang state government under Lim's leadership managed to strengthen ties and forge friendship with the state of Victoria, Australia when the Governor of Victoria Alex Chernov made an official day-long visit to Penang with the invitation of the state government.

On 15 November 2011 Penang had hosted an official visit by the Governor General of Canada the Right Honourable David Johnston and the ex-Speaker of the Kanagawa Prefecture of Japan for 2 days. Penang had managed to forge foreign relations with Canada and Japan, which consequently strengthened trade ties to lure foreign investors to Penang. Johnston's first visit to the state was welcomed by Lim and the Yang di-Pertua Negeri of Penang Abdul Rahman Abbas. They walked around the Penang Heritage Trail together with his delegation.

Other foreign delegations who visited Penang include the South Australian Minister of Police and Governor of Bangkok Sukhumbhand Paribatra.

Several investment and business delegations have been led by Lim on state visits to Tokyo, Bangkok, Singapore, Melbourne, Adelaide, Abu Dhabi and Dubai. Lim's official visit to Bangkok also witnessed the signing of a Memorandum of Understanding (MOU) between Penang and Bangkok, which enabled Penang to be a fast-growing world-class and international city. Prior to this state visit, Penang was looking to develop its tourism by seeking co-operation with Bangkok. Lim said that the state aspires to be achieve global city status by becoming a major economic hub, a top choice for investors, a desirable place for tourists and a habitat of choice for people who want to earn a sustainable living.

Penang Transport Master Plan
In December 2015, the Penang state government implemented the RM27 billion Penang Transport Master Plan (PTMP). It covers various mass transportation systems such as Light Rail Transit (LRT), LRT link between Penang Island and Seberang Perai, monorail, trams, bus transit system (BTS), catamaran (water taxis) across the channel between Penang Island and Seberang Perai, and cable car. Besides that, the master plan also incorporates Pan-Island Link Highway which connects Gurney Drive and Bayan Lepas via Air Itam. Furthermore, the Penang state government plans to reclaim two man-made islands, which is 930ha of land and another 445ha of land off the coast of Permatang Damar Laut south of Penang Island to cover the cost of the project. The transport master plan aims to ease ongoing traffic congestion problems in Penang.

Minister of Finance 
After the Pakatan Harapan (PH) coalition (of which the DAP is part) emerged victorious in the 2018 Malaysian general election and formed the Federal Government, Prime Minister Mahathir Mohamad announced Lim Guan Eng's appointment as the Minister of Finance. He succeeded Najib Razak of BN. Lim is the first ethnic-Chinese Malaysian to hold the position since Tan Siew Sin of the Malaysian Chinese Association (MCA) served from 1959 to 1974.

In September 2018, Lim cancelled two contracts, worth approximately $2.795 billion, with China Petroleum Pipeline Bureau for oil and gas pipelines, stating that some of the funding from the Exim Bank of China had been misappropriated as part of the 1MDB scandal.

Lim has announced B40 (Bottom 40 per cent) National Protection Scheme, which is a free national health insurance scheme for the low income starting from 1 January 2019 at an initial cost of RM2 billion. The insurance scheme will improve access to health coverage and ease the burden of the low income families.

Besides that, Lim under the Finance Ministry has announced that first-time home buyers will be fully exempted from stamp duty for properties up to RM1 million starting from 1 January 2019.

Appointment as DAP's National Chairman 
On 20 March 2022, at the 17th DAP National Congress, Lim was re-elected into the Central Executive Committee with 1,311 votes, the 8th highest vote. He then stepped down from the secretary-general role he had held for 17 years, and was appointed National Chairman of the party.

Corruption charges

Below-market price bungalow purchase 
In 2015, Lim allegedly used his position as then Penang chief minister to gain gratification for himself and his wife, Betty Chew Gek Cheng, by approving the application for conversion of agricultural land to a public housing zone in Balik Pulau to a company, Magnificent Emblem Sdn Bhd, owned by Phang Li Koon. In 2016, Lim allegedly used his position to obtain a plot of land and bungalow at 25, Jalan Pinhorn, from Phang for RM2.8 million, at below market value. The market price for the land and bungalow at that time was RM4.27 million. Lim knew Phang had a formal relationship with him. He allegedly carried out the offense at the bungalow in Jalan Pinhorn.

On 29 June 2016, Lim is arrested at his office by MACC on the 28th floor of Komtar at 5.45pm, while Phang is arrested at 4.15pm at her sixth-floor office in Penang Garden. On 30 June 2016, Lim and Phang are charged with corruption in the George Town Sessions Court. The case is transferred to the High Court under Section 60 of the MACC Act, which allows the prosecution to transfer the case to the High Court tor hearing. Lim faces two charges - one under Section 23 of the MACC Act and the other under Section 165 of the Penal Code.

On 26 March 2018, the first day of trial, Lim and Phang plead not guilt to the amended charges read out before judge Hadhariah. First witness to be called is blogger Muhsin Lahteef, known as Mamu Parpu, who testifies about the report he lodged to MACC about the case on 18 March 2016. It is reported at least seven witnesses will be called that day, with 54 witnesses to be called in the next five weeks.

On 9 April 2018, the High Court postpones the trial to 21 May, following a defence application that Lim needs to prepare for the 14th General Election. On 9 May 2018, Pakatan Harapan wins GE14, which ends Barisan Nasional's 61-year grip on power. On 12 May 2018, Prime Minister Mahathir Mohamad names Lim as finance minister. On 13 May 2018, Mahathir says Lim can be officially appointed finance minister only if he clears his corruption case. Mahathir clarifies that Lim has merely been named finance minister, but has yet to take his oath of office.

On 3 September 2018, the court grants Lim and Phang a discharge amounting to an acquittal.

Consortium Zenith corruption charge
On 6 August 2020, Lim Guan Eng was accused of using his position as chief minister to ask Consortium Zenith Construction Sdn Bhd (Zenith) senior director Zarul Ahmad Mohd Zulkifli for 10% of the profits which would be made from the roads and tunnel project. He was charged under Section 16(a)(A) of the Malaysian Anti Corruption Commission Act. He pleaded not guilty in the Sessions Court of asking for a 10% cut from the profits of the undersea tunnel project.

On 10 August 2020, Lim was charged with receiving a bribe worth RM3.3 million in relation to the Penang undersea tunnel project. This is the second charge that was also related to the same project.

On 5 August 2021, Ewe Swee Kheng, a property developer and one of the witnesses for the prosecution, fell to his death from his apartment.

On 4 August 2022, Consortium Zenith Construction Sdn Bhd (Zenith) senior director Zarul Ahmad Mohd Zulkifli told the Kuala Lumpur Sessions Court that he had lied to the press via media statements issued to reporters in 2018 after being remanded by MACC. He admitted that everything involving the undersea tunnel project was "done above the board" and the project involved no corruption during a cross-examination by Lim's lawyer Gobind Singh Deo. Zarul also informed the court that the company was forced to protect its interests by paying fees to people who claimed to represent the then Prime Minister Najib Razak.

Controversies and issues

Leadership in Penang
In 2012, the Penang state UMNO Youth Chief accused the Penang state government of breaking the law in selling the Bayan Mutiara land to developer Ivory Property Group Berhad without subdividing the land. He also claimed that the state government sold the land without open tender and made no provision for mosques. However, Lim Guan Eng showed evidence that it has been sold via open tender and thus explained that the developer would only do the subdividing when it submits development plans for the 41.5-ha real estate project to the Penang Municipal Council. The developer had clarified that land for the mosque and school has been allocated and adhered to the town planning regulation after the new plans and subdivision of title has been submitted.

In 2013, his official trip to Xiamen and Hainan in China with a delegation including his wife were criticised by the Penang MCA for practicing double standard in his stand for bringing his spouse on an official trip. Penang MCA Secretary, Lau Chiek Tan said "Previously, Lim had criticised Barisan Nasional leaders for wasting public funds by bringing their families with them on official trips. We now see Pakatan Rakyat leaders doing the same with this trip to China."

In 2014, he was criticized for swapping his two-month-old Toyota Camry official car for a new Mercedes-Benz S300L. Netizens and NGOs commented that he did not practise what he preached because in 2008 he had condemned the Terengganu State Government for buying a fleet of Mercedes-Benz cars as its official cars. The Barisan Nasional MP for Kota Belud, Datuk Abdul Rahman Dahlan, accused Lim of being "hypocritical". Lim defended his decision, saying that he had bought the car at a discounted price.

Disparaging the security of the state of Johor
On 20 September 2011, Lim Guan Eng participated in an interview conducted by Australian Broadcasting Corporation where he was reported by the Malaysian news agency, Bernama, to have disparaged the security of the state of Johor. Lim Guan Eng insisted he never mentioned Johor, and demanded that Bernama retract their story and issue a formal apology, or face a lawsuit. However, a recording was later revealed by TV3, showing clear evidence of Lim Guan Eng proclaiming that Singaporeans who are in Johor are "likely to be kidnapped". The recording of Lim Guan Eng's remark was made in Singapore. This led Lim Guan Eng to issue a formal apology to the Sultan of Johor.

Penang Voluntary Patrol Unit
Lim was involved in a controversy regarding the establishment of the Penang Voluntary Patrol Unit (PPS) which was declared illegal by Ministry of Home Affairs. He however, declared it a legal entity and challenged Khalid Abu Bakar, who was then Malaysia's Inspector-general of police to a debate on the legitimacy of the PPS. He then challenged the Home Ministry's declaration in court. His case however, was thrown out of court by the High Court. However, on 28 March 2017, the Court of Appeal ruled that the Penang Voluntary Patrol Unit (PPS) is a legal organisation established by the Penang state government.

Legal suits
On 14 December 2011, Lim won a second defamation suit against Malay daily Utusan Malaysia, which was ordered by the Penang High Court to pay a total of RM200,000 worth of damages and a cost of RM25,000 to him. Utusan Malaysia had allegedly published a defamatory news article about Lim entitled "Kebiadapan Guan Eng" (Guan Eng's Arrogance) which had defamed his political career, and subsequently pictured him and DAP as anti-Malay and anti-Muslim.

On 22 June 2012, Lim won a defamation suit against Utusan Malaysia, which was ordered by High Court to pay a total of RM200,000 worth of damages and RM20,000 in costs to the former. The Malay daily had been found guilty by the court of defaming Lim in a published news article headlined "Tiada Lagi DEB" (No More NEP), which said that Lim would abolish the New Economic Policy.

In December 2013 an article quoting Jimmy Lim entitled "Guan Eng has failed, says NGO", about what he characterised as the destruction of Malaysian heritage in developments schemes carried out under the government of Lim Guan Eng, was published on the Malaysian online news portal Free Malaysia Today. Lim Guan Eng then sued Jimmy Lim as well as other parties alleging defamation, and in August 2013 received a decision at the George Town High Court in his favour ordering the defendants to pay RM300,000 in damages and RM30,000 in legal costs. This decision, however, was overturned in 2016 on appeal to the Malaysian Court of Appeal, on the grounds that the article taken as a whole was not defamatory. Judge Hamid Sultan Abu Backer, the chair of the court, described the article as "written in a temperate tone".

On 30 January 2015, he, with two news portals, Malaysiakini and The Malaysian Insider were sued by Penang UMNO secretary, Datuk Musa Sheikh Fadzir, Maison Height Sdn Bhd and Penang Barisan Nasional secretary Datuk Omar Faudzar for making defamatory article on the alleged sale of Malay lands for profit. In the statement of claim, the plaintiffs referred to an article written by Lim titled "Pembohongan Umno" (Umno's lies), which was published in The Malaysian Insider on 27 Nov 2014, and another article titled "Stop spreading lies about Penang government, Guan Eng tells Umno" which was also published in the same news portal on 27 Nov.The plaintiffs stated that Lim, Mkini and Gan had caused the publication of another article "Umno made profits by selling Malay Kampungs", containing defamatory words in Malaysiakini.
The plaintiffs filed a notice of discontinuance on 1 April 2016.

On 26 March 2015, Lim won a defamation suit against Perkasa, New Straits Times and Utusan Malaysia concerning an article over a dinner which Lim attended in Singapore in 2011. The latter were ordered by the High Court to pay RM550,000 in damages. Justice Nor Bee Ariffin ordered Perkasa chief Datuk Ibrahim Ali, information chief Ruslan Kassim and Perkasa to pay RM150,000; New Straits Times former group editor Datuk Syed Nazri Syed Harun and NSTP RM200,000 and Utusan Melayu group editor-in-chief Datuk Abdul Aziz Ishak and Utusan Melayu RM200,000. Justice Nor Bee Ariffin said that Syed Nazri, NSTP, Abdul Aziz and Utusan Melayu failed to practice responsible journalism.

On 3 July 2015, he lost a lawsuit brought by the state opposition leader, Datuk Jahara Hamid. Lim had allegedly called Datuk Jahara a "racist grandmother" in December 2013. Lim was ordered to pay RM 500,000 in damages at 5% interest per annum and RM 40,000 in legal costs. He was also ordered to retract the statement. The judicial commissioner said that he had been unprofessional (as a chief minister) to resort to name calling an opposition leader and had brought disrepute to both the state assembly and the office of Chief Minister. His sexist statement was also condemned by the chairperson of the women's wing of the DAP, Chong Eng; Zuraida Kamaruddin, chairperson of the women's wing of Parti Keadilan Rakyat (PKR); and several female Senators.

In August 2017, Lim filed a suit against New Straits Times Press (Malaysia) Bhd (NSTP) for running an article titled "Political Intervention was real, says PAS", which accused him of interfering in Islamic affairs. On 2 November 2018, the High Court ordered NSTP to pay damages of RM200,000 to Lim and directed NSTP to publish an unconditional and unreserved apology admitting that the article was defamatory to him.

On 19 September 2018, a consent judgment was reached before the High Court with the publisher of the New Straits Times and Berita Harian newspapers agreeing to publish an apology and pay Lim RM130,000 in damages over three defamatory articles published in January 2018, quoting Teng Chang Yeow who accused Lim of lying about Penang government's payments to the contractors of the undersea tunnel and three main roads project.

Election results

References

Notes
  – "Guan Eng and wife voted out of Malacca DAP committee".
  – Beh "Mr and Mrs Lim's defeat a 'conspiracy'".
  – "Lim Guan Eng Reassures Penang".

See also
 Air Putih (Penang state constituency)
 Kota Melaka (federal constituency)
 Bagan (federal constituency)
 Pakatan Rakyat
 Pakatan Harapan

Citations

 "Guan Eng and wife voted out of Malacca DAP committee". (19 December 2005). The Star.
 Beh, Lih Yi (19 December 2005). "Mr and Mrs Lim's defeat a 'conspiracy'". Malaysiakini.
 "The trial of opposition parliamentarian Lim Guan Eng: an update". (1 March 1997). Amnesty International.
 "Lim Guan Eng released but his civil rights remain curtailed". (25 August 1999). Amnesty International.
 Lim Guan Eng Biodata
 TheStar Article

|-

|-

|-

|-

|-

1962 births
Living people
People from Johor Bahru
Malaysian people of Hokkien descent
Malaysian people of Chinese descent
Malaysian politicians of Chinese descent
Malaysian prisoners and detainees
Prisoners and detainees of Malaysia
Malaysian politicians convicted of crimes
Malaysian accountants
Democratic Action Party (Malaysia) politicians
Government ministers of Malaysia
Finance ministers of Malaysia
Members of the Dewan Rakyat
Chief Ministers of Penang
Members of the Penang State Legislative Assembly
Penang state executive councillors
Monash University alumni
21st-century Malaysian politicians